Neocononicephora is a genus of Asian bush crickets, belonging to the tribe Meconematini of the subfamily Meconematinae.  Three species have been found to date (2020): all from Vietnam.

Species
The Orthoptera Species File lists:
 Neocononicephora fyanensis Wang, 2020
 Neocononicephora sinuosa Wang, 2020
 Neocononicephora storozhenkoi (Gorochov, 1994) - type species (as Cononicephora storozhenkoi Gorochov), locality Gia Lai, Vietnam

References 

Tettigoniidae genera
Meconematinae
Orthoptera of Vietnam